Ghost in the Castle is a 1945/1947 German comedy horror film directed by Hans H. Zerlett and starring Margot Hielscher, Fritz Odemar, and Albert Matterstock.

The film's sets were designed by the art director  and Heinrich Weidemann. It was shot at the Bavaria Studios in Munich. The film was produced in the latter stages of the Second World War and completed in March 1945, but was not released until 1947.

Cast

See also
 Überläufer

References

Bibliography

External links 
 

1947 films
Films of Nazi Germany
1940s comedy horror films
German comedy horror films
West German films
1940s German-language films
Films directed by Hans H. Zerlett
Bavaria Film films
Films shot at Bavaria Studios
Films set in castles
German black-and-white films
1947 comedy films
1940s German films